Eodorcadion licenti is a species of beetle in the family Cerambycidae. It was described by Pic in 1939.

References

Dorcadiini
Beetles described in 1939